The 1959–60 season of the Moroccan Throne Cup was the fourth edition of the competition.

The teams played one-legged matches. In case of a draw, the matches were replayed at the opponents' stadium.

Mouloudia Club d'Oujda beat Fath Union Sport 1–0 in the final, played at the Stade d'honneur in Casablanca. Mouloudia Club d'Oujda won the cup for the third time in their history.

Tournament 

The final took place between the winners of the two semi-finals, Mouloudia Club d'Oujda and Fath Union Sport, on 24 April 1960 at the Stade d'honneur in Casablanca. The match was refereed by Salih Mohamed Boukkili. It was the fourth consecutive final for MC Oujda in the competition. MC Oujda won the competition for the third time in their history, thanks to a penalty by Madani.

The lineup for FUS was:
 FUS : Mohammed El Ayachi, Alami I, Samame, Houcine Kyoud, Ben Omar, Abderrazak, Alami II, Lacombe, Gharbaoui, Mohammed Tounsi, Mohammed Labsir.

Notes and references

Sources 
 Rsssf.com

1959
1959 in African football
1960 in African football
1959–60 in Moroccan football